Paul Stanley Boris (born December 13, 1955) is a retired Major League Baseball pitcher. He played during one season at the major-league level for the Minnesota Twins. Boris played his first professional season with their Class A-Advanced Fort Lauderdale Yankees in 1978, and his last with the Atlanta Braves' Triple-A Richmond Braves in 1984.

On April 10, 1982, he was traded by the Yankees to the Twins, along with reliever Ron Davis and shortstop Greg Gagne for Twins' all-star shortstop, Roy Smalley.

External links

1955 births
Living people
Minnesota Twins players
Nashville Sounds players
Fort Lauderdale Yankees players
Orlando Twins players
Richmond Braves players
Toledo Mud Hens players
Major League Baseball pitchers
Baseball players from New Jersey
People from Irvington, New Jersey
Rutgers Scarlet Knights baseball players
Sportspeople from Essex County, New Jersey